The Leinster Senior League Senior Division is the top division of the Leinster Senior League. It is organized by the Leinster Football Association. Together with the Munster Senior League Senior Premier Division and the Ulster Senior League Senior Division, it forms the third level of the Republic of Ireland football league system. Formed in 1896, it is the oldest association football league in what is now the Republic of Ireland. Shelbourne have won the most titles. However, in more recent seasons Crumlin United, Cherry Orchard, Wayside Celtic and Bangor Celtic have been the divisions strongest teams. In 2014–15 Bluebell United were Leinster Senior League champions, 27 years after winning their previous title.
Clubs from this division play in the Leinster Senior Cup, the FAI Cup, the FAI Intermediate Cup and the FAI Junior Cup. In recent seasons the winners of the Senior Division have also been invited to play in the League of Ireland Cup.

From 1896–97 until 1964–65, the league was the de facto second-level league in what is now the Republic of Ireland. Initially the Irish Football League was the top level. Then for one season, 1920–21, the Leinster Senior League was briefly the top-level league. However, this status was short-lived and ended with the establishment of the League of Ireland in 1921–22. The Leinster Senior League remained a second-level league until 1964–65, when it was effectively replaced by the League of Ireland B Division. With the establishment of the A Championship in 2008, it became a fourth-level league. However, since the demise of the A Championship in 2011, it has reverted to third-level status.

2022–23 teams

Promotion and relegation
A promotion and relegation system operates within the Leinster Senior League structure itself. However, there is no formal promotion and relegation relationship with the League of Ireland. Teams can only be "promoted" by sending an application to the FAI. In the past successful and prominent members of the Leinster Senior League have regularly been invited and/or elected to join the League of Ireland. Current League of Ireland clubs Bohemians, Shelbourne, Shamrock Rovers, Sligo Rovers, St Patrick's Athletic and Bray Wanderers are all former Leinster Senior League champions. While Bohemians and Shelbourne were founding members of the League of Ireland, Shamrock Rovers, Sligo Rovers and St Patrick's Athletic were all effectively "promoted" to the League of Ireland after winning the Leinster Senior League Senior Division title. Incidentally both Rovers and St Pats won successive Leinster Senior League and League of Ireland titles in 1921-22 and 1922-23 and 1950–51 and 1951–52 respectively. 
 Current League of Ireland clubs Athlone Town, Dundalk, Longford Town, UCD and Cabinteely are also former members of the Leinster Senior League
 Former League of Ireland clubs Drumcondra, Dolphins, Reds United and St James's Gate have all been Leinster Senior League champions who were then "promoted" or elected to the League of Ireland. 
 Shelbourne United, Brideville, Bray Unknowns, Transport, Bray Wanderers, Home Farm and St Francis are all former Leinster Senior League champions who were elected to the League of Ireland several seasons after winning the Leinster title.     
 Jacobs, Brideville, Transport and St James's Gate all dropped out of the League of Ireland to play in the Leinster Senior League. All four subsequently won the Senior Division. Brideville and Gate both later rejoined the League of Ireland.

Reserve Teams
Throughout its history the Leinster Senior League Senior Division has regularly featured the reserve teams of League of Ireland teams. The reserve teams of Shelbourne, Bohemians, Shamrock Rovers, St Patrick's Athletic, Brideville, Drumcondra and Dolphins have all been Senior Division champions in their own right. The reserve teams of Cabinteely and UCD currently play in the lower levels of the Leinster Senior League.

History

Foundation
Within a few seasons of the Leinster Football Association been formed in 1892, the Leinster Senior League was established. Ciarán Priestley highlights a printed notice in the 4 September 1894 edition of The Irish Times. Under the headline "Leinster Football League"  there is a report of "a general meeting of the league... held the other evening at 27 D'Olier Street". Priestley also lists Bohemians, Britannia, Dublin University, Leinster Nomads, Phoenix and Montpelier as participants in the first season. The Leinster Senior League website states it was established in 1896. However other sources suggest the league started a little later and was first played for in 1897–98 and that an unidentified British Army regimental team where the inaugural winners while Shelbourne were runners up.

Bohemians and Shelbourne era
Up until the 1920s the league was dominated by Bohemians and Shelbourne. These two clubs still remain the league's two most successful teams based on titles they won in this era. Even when Bohemians and Shelbourne joined the Irish Football League in 1902 and 1904 respectively, their reserve teams continued to win titles regularly. Initially only St James's Gate and British Army regimental teams challenged the Bohemians/Shelbourne duopoly. During the First World War the Irish Football League was suspended and the senior teams of both Bohemians and Shelbourne rejoined the Leinster Senior League. Meanwhile, their northern counterparts competed in the Belfast & District League. The 1919–20 saw a return to an all-Ireland
league. However further disruption caused by the Irish War of Independence meant this was short-lived and at the end of this season Bohemians and Shelbourne withdrew from the Irish Football League permanently. They subsequently rejoined the Leinster Senior League and for the 1920–21 season. The league now briefly became the top level league in what is now the Republic of Ireland. 1920–21 also saw Shelbourne United emerge as champions, becoming only the fourth civilian team to win the title.

1920s
The 1921–22 season saw the establishment of the League of Ireland and this had a considerable impact on the Leinster Senior League. All eight founding League of Ireland members – Shelbourne, Bohemians, St James's Gate, Jacobs, Olympia, Dublin United, Frankfort  and YMCA – had all spent the previous season playing in the Leinster Senior League. The emergence of the League of Ireland thus created a number of vacancies in the Senior Division and among the clubs who filled them were Shamrock Rovers. For the 1921–22 season Rovers were joined in the Senior Division by Bohemians B, St James's Gate B, Bray Unknowns, Midland Athletic, Pioneers, Brooklyn, Shelbourne United, Merrion, Glasnevin, CYMS and Richmond. With a team that included John Joe Flood, William Glen, Bob Fullam and Dinny Doyle, Rovers won the Senior Division and reached the 1921–22 FAI Cup final.  The 1922–23 season saw the League of Ireland expand to twelve teams. After Frankfort and YMCA dropped out, six new teams – Shamrock Rovers, Midland Athletic, Pioneers, Shelbourne United, Athlone Town and  Rathmines Athletic  – were invited to join. Once again the Leinster Senior League provided most of the League of Ireland's newest members. Further vacancies in the Senior Division were now created and among the clubs who subsequently filled them were Brideville, Dolphins, Dundalk and Drumcondra. Like Shelbourne United and Shamrock Rovers before them, Bray Unknowns, Brideville, Drumcondra and Dolphins all won the Leinster Senior League title and were then invited to join the League of Ireland. Brooklyn were also elected to the League of Ireland for the 1923–24 season. Dundalk joined the Leinster Senior League in 1922–23. They were runners up in 1923–24 and then finished third in 1925–26 before making their League of Ireland debut in 1926–27. While playing in Leinster Senior League, Drumcondra also won an FAI Intermediate Cup / FAI Cup double in 1926–27.

1930s
During the 1930s three more Leinster Senior League champions made the step up to the League of Ireland. These included Sligo Rovers, Brideville and Reds United. At the end of the 1931–32 League of Ireland season Brideville dropped out. However 1932–33 saw them win their second Leinster Senior League title. 1932–33 also Sligo Rovers join the Leinster Senior League. In their first season they finished third. During the season they had twice beaten the champions Brideville and also defeated Bohemians B. In 1933–34 Sligo Rovers achieved a treble, winning the Leinster Senior League, the FAI Intermediate Cup and the LFA Metropolitan Cup. On the back of this success, they joined the League of Ireland for the 1934–35 season. The following season, 1935–36 saw Brideville return to the League of Ireland along with the 1934–35 Leinster Senior League champions, Reds United. During the late 1930s and 1940s the Leinster Senior League's most successful team was Distillery. They won the title five times during period. However unlike some of their contemporaries, Distillery never moved up the League of Ireland.

St Patrick's Athletic era
During the late 1940s and 1950s the strongest team in the Leinster Senior League was St Patrick's Athletic. During this period they won the league title on six occasions. This included four successive titles between 1947–48 and 1950–51. In 1947–48 St Pat's completed a treble after also winning both the FAI Intermediate Cup and Leinster Senior Cup. The 1948–49 season would see St Pat's win a Leinster Senior League / FAI Intermediate Cup. In 1950–51 a young Shay Gibbons helped St Pat's win the Leinster Senior League title for a fourth time. St Pat's were subsequently invited to join the 1951–52 League of Ireland and went on to win their first League of Ireland title at their first attempt. With St Pat's first team now in the League of Ireland, their reserve team won two further Leinster Senior League titles in 1955–56 and 1956–57.

List of winners by club
 Brackets indicate a victory for the club's reserve team.

List of winners by season

Notes

References

 
!
Ireland
3
1
1
Professional sports leagues in Ireland